Abraham Lion Zeelander (1789-1856) was a Dutch Jewish engraver who worked in Amsterdam. Like Moritz Dessauer, he was a member of the Amsterdam Academy. He "engraved in outline the gallery of Willem II".

References

External links
Prints by Zeelander at the Rijksmuseum, Amsterdam

1789 births
1856 deaths
Engravers from Amsterdam
Dutch Jews